David Matthews is an American professional blackjack player and writer. He has competed in the World Series of Blackjack and is the winner of the first season of the CBS elimination blackjack tournament series Ultimate Blackjack Tour. He writes articles on blackjack and tournament strategy for All In magazine and his articles have been published at Get21 in the ‘Learn from the Pros’ section.

External links
 David Matthews interview at UBT.com

Further reading
How to Win Blackjack Tournaments. An interview with David Matthews

Living people
American blackjack players
American gambling writers
American male non-fiction writers
Year of birth missing (living people)